Tai Woffinden (born 10 August 1990) is a British speedway rider. He is a three-time World Champion (2013, 2015 and 2018).

Early life
Woffinden was born in Scunthorpe, the son of former speedway rider Rob Woffinden. Although born in the United Kingdom and competing as a British rider, Woffinden grew up in Perth, Western Australia after his parents Rob and Sue decided to move there in 1994.

Career 

Woffinden began his career in junior speedway in Perth where he won the 2006 Western Australian Under-16 title, though he unfortunately missed riding in the Australian Under-16 Championship in Adelaide. He started his British career with the Scunthorpe Scorpions in the Conference League in 2006. With the Scorpions he completed a clean sweep of Conference League trophies, winning the Championship, Conference Trophy, Conference Shield and the Knockout Cup. When he turned sixteen years of age he made his Premier League debut for the Sheffield Tigers as a guest rider. In 2006, he became an asset of Wolverhampton Wolves after he signed a full contract with the Elite League side.

2007 saw Woffinden return to Scunthorpe in the Conference League and he signed on a season's loan with the Rye House Rockets in the Premier League, the Rockets clinched the Premier League Championship in 2007 after beating the Sheffield Tigers in the final. In August 2007 he also signed for the Poole Pirates in the Elite League to ride at reserve, sharing the spot with Rye House Rockets team-mate Steve Boxall for the rest of the season. In 2007, Woffinden became the youngest ever rider to appear in the British Championship Final but suffered injury in a crash and had to withdraw from the meeting. In September he became the Conference League Riders Champion and then two days later won the British Under 18 Championship.

Woffinden signed for the Rye House Rockets again for the 2008 season and this was also the season he made his debut for Great Britain in the Speedway World Cup, impressing with a win against world class opposition.  He also finished third in the British Speedway Championship. This finish qualified Woffinden to be a track reserve at the British Grand Prix but he did not have an opportunity to ride. Woffinden became British Under-21 Champion in 2008. The event was held at the Arena Essex Raceway, with Woffinden only dropping one point in the qualifying heats and winning the final ahead of Adam Roynon and Ben Barker. Woffinden is the first rider to hold both the British Under-18 and British Under-21 title during the same season. He was also the first rider to be the British Under 18 Champion for two consecutive seasons.

Woffinden agreed to ride for his parent club, the Wolverhampton Wolves, for the 2009 Elite League season.

On 15 April 2011 Tai Woffinden won the British Under 21 Championship, held at the Arena Essex Raceway.  After his father's death from cancer in 2010, the Rob Woffinden Classic has become one of the biggest events for speedway bikes in Western Australia. Tai won the Classic named for his late father in 2012 at the  Pinjar Park Speedway in Perth.

In 2013 Woffinden won the Speedway Grand Prix series to become World Champion. He was the 8th British rider to become World Champion and the first one to hold the British Championship and World Championship in the same year since Gary Havelock in 1992. He was also the youngest World Champion in the modern day GP competition at the time. He also won Motorcycle News Man of the Year Award for 2013. Also in 2013, Woffinden competed in his only European Championship  finishing 5th during the 2013 Speedway European Championship.

Woffinden captained the Great Britain team that finished fourth in the 2014 Speedway World Cup Final in Bydgoszcz, Poland. Until the end of 2014 he also rode for the Wolverhampton Wolves in the British Elite League, but announced in late 2014 that he would not be riding in Britain during 2015 in his quest to regain his World Championship. After dropping to fourth place in the 2014 Speedway Grand Prix season, Woffinden bounced back in 2015 to regain the Speedway World Championship, becoming the first British rider to win two world individual titles since Peter Craven won his second in 1962. On the way to his second championship success, Woffinden won the Czech Republic and Scandinavian Grand Prix while finishing second in Finland, Sweden and Slovenia and third in Poland II. 

In 2016 and 2017, he finished second and third respectively in the 2017 World Championship and the 2017 World Championship, which included winning a Grand Prix in Warsaw and Gorzów. In 2016 the Speedway World Cup final was held at the national speedway stadium at Belle Vue, Manchester where team GB were runners up to Poland.

In 2018, Woffinden won his third world title ending the 2018 Speedway Grand Prix on 139 points and ten clear of rival Bartosz Zmarzlik. This included four Grand Prix wins in Horsens, Warsaw, Teterow and Torun. After a poor 2019 Championship he bounced back by taking the silver medal during the 2020 Speedway Grand Prix, this time behind Zmarzlik.

In 2021, he became a team world champion after Great Britain secured the 2021 Speedway of Nations (the world team title). He also the Czech Grand Prix on the way to a sixth place finish during the 2021 Speedway Grand Prix.

In 2022, he finished in 8th place during the 2022 Speedway World Championship, after securing 93 points during the 2022 Speedway Grand Prix. Despite finishing outside of the top six he was selected by the SGP Commission as one of the riders for the 2023 Speedway Grand Prix. 

In 2023, he signed for Västervik in Sweden after spending the 2002 season with Esbjerg in Denmark. He also renewed his Polish contract with Sparta Wrocław.

Major results

World individual Championship
2010 Speedway Grand Prix - 14th
2011 Speedway Grand Prix - 25th
2013 Speedway Grand Prix - Winner (including Czech Republic grand prix win)
2014 Speedway Grand Prix - 4th (including Czech Republic and Sweden grand prix wins)
2015 Speedway Grand Prix - Winner (including Czech Republic & Scandinavian grand prix wins)
2016 Speedway Grand Prix - runner up (including Warsaw grand prix win)
2017 Speedway Grand Prix - 3rd (including Gorzów grand prix wins
2018 Speedway Grand Prix - Winner (including Warsaw, Torun, German & Danish grand prix wins)
2019 Speedway Grand Prix - 13th
2020 Speedway Grand Prix - runner up
2021 Speedway Grand Prix - 6th (including Czech Republic grand prix win)
2022 Speedway Grand Prix - 8th

World team Championships
2008 Speedway World Cup - 5th
2009 Speedway World Cup - 5th
2010 Speedway World Cup - 4th
2011 Speedway World Cup - 6th
2012 Speedway World Cup - 5th
2013 Speedway World Cup - 7th
2014 Speedway World Cup - 4th
2015 Speedway World Cup - 5th
2016 Speedway World Cup - runner up
2018 Speedway of Nations - runner up
2019 Speedway of Nations - 7th
2021 Speedway of Nations - Winner

European Championship
2013 Speedway European Championship - 5th

See also 
 Great Britain national speedway team

References

External links 
 

1990 births
Living people
British speedway riders
English motorcycle racers
Individual Speedway World Champions
British Speedway Championship winners
Sportspeople from Scunthorpe
Rye House Rockets riders
Scunthorpe Scorpions riders